Jonathan Douglas Gray (born 14 March 1994) is a Scotland international rugby union player. He plays at lock for Exeter Chiefs in Premiership Rugby.

Rugby union career

Amateur career

Gray started playing rugby at Cambuslang RFC where he progressed from the mini section (at 7 years old) through to first XV regular at the age of 16. He also played for Calderglen High School in East Kilbride.

Gray is the younger brother of Scottish and British and Irish Lion international Richie Gray.

Gray was drafted to Currie in the Scottish Premiership for the 2017–18 season.

Professional career

In 2013, Gray was offered a full-time contract for three years by Glasgow Warriors Domestically, the 2014–15 season saw Gray play a prominent role in Glasgow Warriors' maiden Pro12 title triumph.

At just 21 years of age, Gray was named captain of Glasgow Warriors in November 2015, taking over from recently retired mentor Alastair Kellock. He became a co-captain with Henry Pyrgos for the 2016-17 season but following the arrival of Dave Rennie as Warriors Head Coach the club has reverted to a sole captaincy. For the 2017-18 season Rennie named Ryan Wilson as captain though Gray remains in the leadership group.

In December 2017, it was announced that, after rejecting an offer from Bristol Rugby, Gray had extended his contract at the Warriors until May 2020. It was announced in January 2020 that Gray would join Exeter Chiefs on a two-year contract ahead of the 2020–21 season, joining up with his Scotland teammates Stuart Hogg, Sam Skinner and Sam Hidalgo-Clyne.

International career

In 2012, Gray was announced in the Scotland national under-20 rugby union team for the 2012 Six Nations Under-20s Championship and retained his position for the 2013 season where he was named captain.

In 2013 Gray was included in a 41-man squad for Scotland's senior side in the 2013 end-of-year rugby union tests.

Gray played in every match for Scotland during the 2015 6 Nations, attempting an astonishing 85 tackles in total and missing only one. Subsequently, he was selected in Scotland's 31-man squad for the 2015 Rugby World Cup, playing four of their five matches in the run to the Quarter-Finals.

As of November 2017, Gray has scored four tries for Scotland, including scores in consecutive weeks against the All Blacks and Australia during the Autumn Internationals

After playing in the first two games of the 2020 Six Nations, Gray sustained a hand injury ruling him out of the rest of the tournament.

References

Supplement

External links
 
Glasgow Warriors Profile
Scotland Rugby Profile

1994 births
Living people
Currie RFC players
Glasgow Warriors players
Rugby union players from Rutherglen
Scotland international rugby union players
Scottish rugby union players

Rugby union locks
Exeter Chiefs players